Stectorium or Stektorion was a town of ancient Phrygia, in the Phrygian Pentapolis between Peltae and Synnada, inhabited during Roman and Byzantine times. Pausanias believed that Mygdon's tomb was located here.

It was an episcopal see of a bishop; no longer a territorial diocese, it remains a Latin Church titular see of the Catholic Church.

Its site is located near Kocahüyük in Asiatic Turkey.

References

Populated places in Phrygia
Former populated places in Turkey
Roman towns and cities in Turkey
Populated places of the Byzantine Empire
History of Afyonkarahisar Province
Catholic titular sees in Asia
Sandıklı District